John Warner Barber (February 2, 1798 – June 22, 1885) was an American engraver and historian whose books of  state, national, and local history featured his vivid illustrations, said to have caught the flavor and appearance of city, town, and countryside scenes in his day.

Life

Barber was born in East Windsor, Connecticut, and  learned his craft from the East Windsor printmaker Abner Reed. He was the second of six children of Elijah Barber, a poor farmer, and Mary Barber. Elijah died during the summer of 1812, which forced the fourteen-year-old John to become responsible for supporting the family. In 1823 he opened a business in New Haven, where he produced religious and historical books, illustrated with his own wood and steel engravings.

He traveled around Connecticut, creating ink sketches of town greens, hotels, schools, churches, and harbors and collected local history as he went. He also delved into the works of historians. From all this he produced the book now commonly called Connecticut Historical Collections. The full title is Connecticut Historical Collections, Containing a General Collection of Interesting Facts, Traditions, Biographical Sketches, Anecdotes, Etc., Relating to the History and Antiquities of Every Town in Connecticut with Geographical Descriptions.

The book has been called "the first popular local history published in the U.S." The book sold well—7,000 copies in its first year even though it cost three dollars, then an average week's pay. Twelve years later it was reissued and again sold well.
  
"Today, though his wood engravings are well known, few copies of the book [Connecticut Historical Collections] remain," according to the Bibliopola Press Web site, which, as of August 2006, was selling a reprint version. "Antique dealers unfortunately do a brisk business selling the woodcuts from volumes they have 'broken.'"

Barber started with rough pencil sketches and developed them into more detailed wash drawings. He then transferred the drawings directly to small blocks of boxwood on which he engraved the designs.

"He talked with townspeople, gathered local documents and made quick sketches everywhere he went," according to a New York Times article from December 10, 1989, quoted on a print-selling Web site. "The illustrations depict each town center, with its homes and churches, academies and courthouses sailboats plying a river or harbor, an occasional factory belching puffs of smoke and always a tiny figure or two, often the artist  in his top hat, sketching the scene or pointing to the view."

He died in New Haven, Connecticut in June 1885.

Gallery

His books
Historical Scenes in the United States (1827)
History and Antiquities of New Haven (1831)
Religious Events (1832)
Historical Collections of Connecticut (1836)
Historical Collections of Massachusetts (Worcester, 1839)
A History of the Amistad Captives, coauthored by E.L. Barber (New Haven, 1840)
History and Antiquities of New England, New York, and New Jersey (1841)
Historical Collections of New York, coauthored by Henry Howe, of New Haven (1841)
Elements of General History (New Haven, 1844)
Historical Collections of New Jersey, coauthored by Henry Howe, of New Haven  (1844)
Historical Collections of Virginia, coauthored by Henry Howe, of New Haven (1844)
Incidents in American History (New York, 1847)
Historical Collections of Ohio, coauthored by Henry Howe, of New Haven (1847)
Religious Emblems and Allegories (1848)
Historical, Poetical, and Pictorial American Scenes, coauthored by Elizabeth G. Barber (1850)
European Historical Collections (1855)
Our Whole Country, Historical and Descriptive (Cincinnati, 1861)
The Bible Looking Glass (Philadelphia, 1874)

See also
 The Picture Preacher, by Henry Howe (Philadelphia)

Footnotes

External links

 A History of the Amistad Captives. New Haven, Ct.: E.L. & J.W. Barber, 1840.
 Guide to John Warner Barber drawings of Massachusetts towns at Houghton Library, Harvard University
 John Warner Barber scrapbook pages, 1832-1868 from the Smithsonian Archives of American Art
 A sampling of Barber's Connecticut drawings at the Connecticut Historical Society

American illustrators
American engravers
19th-century American historians
19th-century American male writers
People from East Windsor, Connecticut
History of Connecticut
History of New York (state)
History of Massachusetts
History of Ohio
History of New Jersey
1798 births
1885 deaths
19th-century American people
American male non-fiction writers
Historians from Connecticut